Gluema is a genus of plant in family Sapotaceae described as a genus in 1935.

Gluema is native to tropical western and west-central Africa.

Species
 Gluema ivorensis Aubrév. & Pellegr. - Ivory Coast, Ghana, Cameroon, Gabon
 Gluema korupensis Burgt - Cameroon

References

 
Flora of Africa
Sapotaceae genera
Taxa named by François Pellegrin
Taxa named by André Aubréville
Taxonomy articles created by Polbot